Narsampally is a village in Medak district in Telangana, India. It falls under Toopran mondal.

References

Villages in Ranga Reddy district